The Martin Marietta X-24 was an American experimental aircraft developed from a joint United States Air Force-NASA program named PILOT (1963–1975). It was designed and built to test lifting body concepts, experimenting with the concept of unpowered reentry and landing, later used by the Space Shuttle.  Originally built as the X-24A, the aircraft was later rebuilt as the X-24B.

The X-24 was drop launched from a modified B-52 Stratofortress at high altitudes before igniting its rocket engine; after expending its rocket fuel, the pilot would glide the X-24 to an unpowered landing.

Design and development

The X-24 was one of a group of lifting bodies flown by the NASA Flight Research Center (now Armstrong Flight Research Center) in a joint program with the U.S. Air Force at Edwards Air Force Base in California from 1963 to 1975. The lifting bodies were used to demonstrate the ability of pilots to maneuver and safely land wingless vehicles designed to fly back to Earth from space and be landed like an airplane at a predetermined site.

Lifting bodies’ aerodynamic lift, essential to flight in the atmosphere, was obtained from their shape. The addition of fins and control surfaces allowed the pilots to stabilize and control the vehicles and regulate their flight paths.

The X-24 (Model SV-5P) was built by Martin Marietta and flown from Edwards AFB, California. The X-24A was the fourth lifting body design to fly; it followed the NASA M2-F1 in 1964, the Northrop HL-10 in (1966), the Northrop M2-F2 in 1966 and preceded the Northrop M2-F3 (1970).

The X-24A was a fat, short teardrop shape with vertical fins for control. It made its first, unpowered, glide flight on April 17, 1969 with Air Force Maj. Jerauld R. Gentry at the controls. Gentry also piloted its first powered flight on March 19, 1970. The craft was taken to around 45,000 feet (13.7 km) by a modified B-52 and then drop launched, then either glided down or used its rocket engine to ascend to higher altitudes before gliding down. The X-24A was flown 28 times at speeds up to 1,036 mph (1,667 km/h) and altitudes up to 71,400 feet (21.8 km).

X-24B
The X-24B's design evolved from a family of potential reentry shapes, each with higher lift-to-drag ratios, proposed by the Air Force Flight Dynamics Laboratory. To reduce the costs of constructing a research vehicle, the Air Force returned the X-24A to the Martin Marietta Corporation (as Martin Aircraft Company became after a merger) for modifications that converted its bulbous shape into one resembling a "flying flatiron"—rounded top, flat bottom, and a double delta planform that ended in a pointed nose.

First to fly the X-24B was John Manke, a glide flight on 1 August 1973. He was also the pilot on the first powered mission 15 November 1973.

X-24C
There were a variety of "X-24C" proposals floated between 1972 and 1978. Perhaps the most notable was a Lockheed Skunk Works design, the L-301, which was to use scramjets to reach a top speed of Mach 8.

SV-5J
After learning about a remark by Chuck Yeager that he would like to have some jet-powered lifting bodies for training purposes, Martin designed and built, on their own initiative, two examples of the SV-5J.

The SV-5J was a jet-powered version of the rocket-powered X-24A.  The SV-5J had identical dimensions to the X-24A, but was powered by a single Pratt & Whitney J60-PW-1 jet engine of 1360 kgf, in place of the X-24A's Reaction Motors XLR-11-RM-13 rocket engine.   Martin also manufactured a full-scale, unflyable, mock-up of the SV-5J. (Confusion over number built may be due to the mock-up being included in the production list.)

Martin were unable to convince Milt Thompson to fly the SV-5J, even after offering a $20,000 bonus. Both examples remained unflown.

As the original X-24A was converted to X-24B, one of the SV-5Js eventually was converted to represent the X-24A, for display at the National Museum of the United States Air Force, Wright-Patterson AFB, Ohio, beside the original X-24B.

The unflyable mock-up ended up in Hollywood and was used for several movies as a space-ship prop.

Operational history
The X-24A was flown 28 times in the program that, like the HL-10, validated the concept that a Space Shuttle vehicle could be landed unpowered. The fastest speed achieved by the X-24A was 1,036 miles per hour (1667 km/h or Mach 1.6). Its maximum altitude was 71,400 feet (21.8 km). It was powered by an XLR-11 rocket engine with a maximum theoretical vacuum thrust of 8,480 pounds force (37.7 kN).

The X-24A was modified into the more stable X-24B with an entirely different shape in 1972. The bulbous shape of the X-24A was converted into a "flying flatiron" shape with a rounded top, flat bottom, and double delta planform that ended in a pointed nose. It was the basis for the Martin SV-5J. The X-24A shape was later borrowed for the X-38 Crew Return Vehicle (CRV) technology demonstrator for the International Space Station.

X-24A pilots
 Jerauld R. Gentry – 13 flights
 John A. Manke – 12 flights
 Cecil W. Powell – 3 flights

X-24B

The X-24B demonstrated that accurate unpowered reentry vehicle landings were operationally feasible. Top speed achieved by the X-24B was 1,164 mph (1873 km/h) and the highest altitude it reached was 74,130 feet (22.59 km). The pilot on the last powered flight of the X-24B was Bill Dana, who also flew the last X-15 flight about seven years earlier.

Among the final flights with the X-24B were two precise landings on the main concrete runway at Edwards. These missions were flown by Manke and Air Force Maj. Mike Love, and represented the final milestone in a program that helped write the flight plan for the Space Shuttle program.

The X-24B was the last aircraft to fly in Dryden's Lifting Body program. The X-24B was flown 36 times.

The X-24B is on public display at the National Museum of the United States Air Force, Wright-Patterson AFB, Ohio.

X-24B pilots
 John A. Manke – 16 flights
 Michael V. Love – 12 flights
 William H. Dana – 2 flights
 Einar K. Enevoldson – 2 flights
 Thomas C. McMurtry – 2 flights
 Francis Scobee – 2 flights
 Les A. Johnson – 1 flight

Serial number
 66-13551
 X-24A, 28 free flights; 10 unpowered, 18 powered
 X-24B, 36 free flights; 12 unpowered, 24 powered

Specifications (X-24B)

See also

References

Notes

Bibliography

 Miller, Jay. The X-Planes: X-1 to X-45. Hinckley, UK: Midland, 2001.
 Reed, R. Dale with Darlene Lister. Wingless Flight: The Lifting Body Story. Lexington, KY: University Press of Kentucky, 2002. .
 Rose, Bill, 2008. Secret Projects: Military Space Technology. Hinckley, England: Midland Publishing.
 Winchester, Jim. "Martin-Marietta X-24." ''X-Planes and Prototypes.' London: Amber Books Ltd., 2005. .

External links

 NASA Dryden X-24 Photo Collection
 X-24A and X-24B at Encyclopedia Astronautica

Edwards Air Force Base
Lifting bodies
X-24, Martin Marietta
Martin Marietta X-24
Rocket-powered aircraft
Aircraft first flown in 1969